Haljala Parish is a rural municipality of Estonia, in Lääne-Viru County. It has a population of 4297 (2021) and an area of 549 km².

Populated places

Small borough
Haljala - Võsu

Villages
Aaspere - Aasu - Aasumetsa - Aaviku - Adaka - Altja - Andi - Annikvere - Auküla - Eisma - Eru - Essu - Idavere - Haili - Idavere - Ilumäe - Joandu - Kakuvälja - Kandle - Karepa - Kärmu - Käsmu -Karula - Kavastu - Kisuvere - Kiva - Kõldu - Koljaku - Koolimäe - Korjuse - Kosta - Kärmu - Lahe - Lauli - Lihulõpe - Liiguste - Lobi - Metsanurga - Metsiku - Muike - Mustoja - Natturi - Noonu - Oandu - Paasi - Pajuveski - Palmse - Pedassaare - Pehka - Pihlaspea - Põdruse - Rutja - Sagadi - Sakussaare - Salatse - Sauste - Tatruse - Tepelvälja - Tidriku - Tiigi - Toolse - Tõugu - Uusküla - Vainupea - Vanamõisa - Varangu - Vatku - Vergi - Vihula - Vila - Villandi - Võhma - Võle - Võsupere

Religion

International relations

Twin towns — Sister cities
Haljala Parish is twinned with:
 Dorotea Municipality, Sweden
 Pyhtää Municipality, Finland
 Schönberg, Germany

References
This article includes content from the Estonian Wikipedia article Haljala vald.

External links